Galaangale is a town in the southeastern Lower Shebelle (Shabeellaha Hoose) region of Somalia.

References
Galaangale

Populated places in Lower Shebelle